Mogens Jensen is the name of:

Mogens Frey Jensen, Danish cyclist
Mogens Jensen (rower), Danish rower
Mogens Jensen (politician), Danish politician